Adam Eric Richard Nditi (born 18 September 1994) is a Tanzanian former footballer.

Club career

Early career
Nditi was born in Zanzibar, Tanzania to Mzee Erick Nditi, a former Zanzibar international footballer. His father moved to England in 1995, and Nditi moved to Basingstoke in 2008, scoring eight goals on his debut for local youth team Down Grange FC, before going on to score another four in his next three games. This form at local level prompted professional side Chelsea to sign him in 2008. Initially a forward at Chelsea, he transitioned to left-back, citing Ashley Cole as a player he looked up to.

He signed a professional contract with Chelsea in July 2012, being assigned the number 47 shirt. He was offered a contract with The Blues in 2014, but stated "I want to be a professional and play first-team football. It’s very hard to do that at Chelsea, so there’s a chance that I might move on this summer." He left the club in July 2014, going on to trial in the Netherlands, as well as an extended trial with Basingstoke Town, before joining Fleetwood Town, who were then in League One.

Career in non-league
He only stayed with Fleetwood Town for a year, before joining Farnborough in the Isthmian League, playing five games in all competitions before leaving only four months after signing. He had a very brief spell with Slough Town, playing in a 2–1 home win against Bideford on 3 October 2015. Following his departure from Slough Town, he played for Guildford City between October 2015 and March 2016, scoring eight goals in sixteen appearances in all competitions, across two spells.

He joined Badshot Lea in February 2016. Later in the same year, he was at Woodley United, where he made four appearances in all competitions, scoring once. He played for Fleet Town, where he played three games in all competitions in the 2017–18 season. By September 2018, he was playing in the Basingstoke and District Sunday League for Chineham. In 2019, he moved from Eversley & California to Cove.

International career
Nditi raised a dispute against the Tanzania Football Federation, accusing them of failing to call him up to the Tanzania senior squad, despite his eligibility.

Personal life
Nditi has three younger brothers; Roberto (born 2000), and twins Zion and Paulo (born 2005). All three started their footballing careers in the Reading academy, with Roberto going on to forge a career in the lower divisions of Scotland.

References

1994 births
Living people
Tanzanian footballers
Association football defenders
Association football midfielders
Isthmian League players
Southern Football League players
Combined Counties Football League players
Chelsea F.C. players
Fleetwood Town F.C. players
Farnborough F.C. players
Slough Town F.C. players
Guildford City F.C. players
Badshot Lea F.C. players
Woodley United F.C. players
Fleet Town F.C. players
Cove F.C. players